Akebia longeracemosa or long-racemed akebia is a member of the chocolate vine genus, Akebia, and more specifically a relative of the commonly known, Akebia quinata.

Description 
It is a twining, semi-evergreen climbing vine which grows up to 8m tall with bright green foliage comprising five, oblong leaflets that may be tinged purple in winter. Fragrant, cup-shaped, purple-red spring flowers borne in pendulous racemes to 15cm long may be followed by purplish, sausage-shaped fruits if cross pollination between two separate species or varieties occurs.

Morphological and molecular evidence suggests that A. longeracemosa is possibly a strange hybrid between A. quinata and A. trifoliata.

Uses

Culinary 
Like most species of Akebia, A. longeracemosa can be eaten and produces purple fruiting bodies similar to A. quinata however there is a lack of information regarding the flavor of this species in particular.

Gallery

References 

Lardizabalaceae